Rainwater Cassette Exchange is an extended-play by Atlanta-based indie rock band Deerhunter. Much like their previous effort, it was recorded at Rare Book Room Studios in Brooklyn with producer Nicolas Vernhes. It became available for download on May 18, 2009, and released on CD and vinyl on June 8. The EP was distributed by Kranky in the US while 4AD handled overseas distribution. The title track became available for download on April 17.

Track listing
All songs by Bradford Cox unless otherwise noted. 
 "Rainwater Cassette Exchange" – 2:23
 "Disappearing Ink" – 2:22 (Moses Archuleta/Bradford Cox/Josh Fauver/Lockett Pundt)
 "Famous Last Words" – 2:15
 "Game of Diamonds" – 3:14 (Bradford Cox/Josh Fauver)
 "Circulation" – 5:04 (Moses Archuleta/Bradford Cox)

Chart positions

References

External links

Deerhunter albums
Garage rock EPs
2009 EPs
4AD EPs
Kranky EPs